Thủ Đức is a former urban district (quận) in the northeast of Hồ Chí Minh City, Vietnam. In 1997, the southern part of Thủ Đức was divided to become District 2 and District 9. In 2010, the district had a population of 455,899. It covered an area of 48 km2.

Thủ Đức district was merged with District 2 and District 9 again to become Thủ Đức City in January 2021, by Standing Committee of the National Assembly's approval.

Location within Ho Chi Minh City

Administration
Thủ Đức district consists of 12 wards: Linh Đông, Linh Tây, Linh Chiểu, Linh Trung, Linh Xuân, Hiệp Bình Chánh, Hiệp Bình Phước, Tam Phú, Trường Thọ, Bình Chiểu, Bình Thọ and Tam Bình.

Amenities
Thủ Đức district hosted the Saigon Water Park which has now closed. It was the location of Thủ Đức Military Academy.

Education
It is the location of Vietnam National University, Ho Chi Minh City.

References

Former districts of Vietnam